Hrangkhol or Hrangkhawl is a Kuki-Chin language spoken by the Hrangkhawl people mainly in Assam and Tripura states in India, with a minority living in Manipur and Mizoram.

References

Languages of Tripura
Kuki-Chin languages
Languages of Assam
Languages of Manipur
Endangered languages of India